The 1910–11 Bradford City A.F.C. season was the eighth in the club's history.

The club finished 5th in Division One, and won the FA Cup, beating Newcastle United in the 1911 FA Cup Final. The club was presented with a new flag and mast by supporters, and the club went on a three-match tour of Scandinavia.

Sources

References

Bradford City A.F.C. seasons
Bradford City